Italian music terminology consists of words and phrases used in the discussion of the music of Italy.  Some Italian music terms are derived from the common Italian language.  Others come from Spanish, or Neapolitan, Sicilian, Sardinian or other regional languages of Italy. The terms listed here describe a genre, song form, dance, instrument, style, quality of music, technique or other important aspect of Italian music.

Dances

alessandrina: A skipping dance from the area around Pavia
alta danza: Early Spanish name for the saltarello
argismo: A Sicilian term for the tarantella healing ritual, from argia, spider
ariosa: A Carnival dance
: A Carnival dance
ballarella: A variant name for the saltarello
ballo dei Gobbi: A Carnival dance, dance of the hunchbacks
ballo della Veneziana: A 2/2 dance of Venetian origin
: A ritual dance
ballo di Mantova: A folk skipping dance
ballu tundu: A traditional Sardinian folk dance
ballu tzopu: A Sardinian folk dance
balùn: A folk dance
bas de tach: A Carnival dance
crellareccia: A wedding dance in the sonata per la sposa of Alta Sabina
danza dei coltelli: The dance of the knives, a knife dance derived from the tarantella
forlana: Venetian term for the furlana
friulana: Venetian term for the furlana
furlana: A folk dance, from Campieli, favored in Venice
furlane: Venetian term for the furlana
frullana: Venetian term for the furlana
gagliarda: Italian term for the galliarde
gagliarde: Italian term for the galliarde
giga: A skipping dance from the area around Pavia
liscio: A ballroom dance
monferrina: A 6/8 dance historically associated with Monferrato and the valleys of Fassa and Rendena
muleta: A Carnival dance
pas in amur: A Carnival dance
passo brabante: An alternate term for the saltarello
passu'e trese: A Sardinian folk dance
perigurdino: A skipping dance from the area around Pavia
piana: A skipping dance from the area around Pavia
povera donna: A skipping dance from the area around Pavia, a Carnival ritual dance
pizzica tarantata: An old form of the tarantella
: A folk dance
roncastalda: A folk skipping dance
rose e fiori: A Carnival dance
ruggero: A folk skipping dance
russiano: A folk dance, said to originate in Russi
sa seria: A Sardinian folk dance
saltarella: A variant name for the saltarello
saltarelle: A variant name for the saltarello
saltarello: A widespread, leaping folk dance, originally in 3/4 time, and later in 3/8 and 6/8, derived from a court dance that evolved from the galliarde and was originally known in Spain as the alta danza, from saltare, to leap
savatarelle: A variant name for the saltarello
sos gocios: A Sardinian folk dance
sos mutos: A Sardinian folk dance
sposina: A skipping dance for brides from the area around Pavia
stuzzichetto: A variant name for the saltarello
su ballu: Popular Sardinian dances
ta matianowa: A folk dance
: A folk dance
ta panawa: A folk dance
tammorriata or tammuriata: A Campanian couple dance, accompanied by lyric songs called strambotti and tammorra tambourines
tarantel: An alternate term for the tarantella
tarantella: A couple dance in 6/8 time, intended to cure the supposedly poisonous bite of the tarantula
tarantismo: An Apulian term for the tarantella healing ritual
tarantolati: The tarantella ritual as it is practiced in Puglia
tarentella: An alternate term for the tarantella
tarentule: An alternate term for the tarantella
ballo tondo: An alternate term for ballu tundu
ballu torrau: A Sardinian folk dance
: A folk dance, one of Italy's oldest

Instrumentation

arpicelli: The Viggiano harp
bena: A Sardinian clarinet
bifora, also pifara: a Sicilian double reed instrument of the oboe family, related to the shawm and to the piffero
bunkula: A cello.
cannacione: A historical, rural form of lute
: A hammered dulcimer
chitarra: A guitar, also a voice in trallalero ensembles that imitates the guitar
chitarra battente: A four- or five-steel stringed guitar, beating guitar
chiterra: A Sardinian guitar
ciaramella: A single-reed pipe, or oboe, also a bagpipe in Alta Sabina
citira: A violin
du' bottë: Abruzzese double bass diatonic accordion
firlinfeu: A panflute
fisarmonica: A chromatic piano accordion
friscalettu: A Sicilian folk flute
ghironda: A hurdy-gurdy most common in Emilia, Lombardy and Piedmont
launeddas: A Sardinian clarinet, played using circular breathing
lira: A three-stringed bowed fiddle, played on the knee, most common in Calabria
mandola: A string instrument similar to both the guitar and mandolin
mandolino: An Italian lute with eight or twelve strings
müsa: A bagpipe
organetto: A diatonic button accordion which accompanies the saltarello, and has largely replaced the bagpipe
piffaro, piffero: A double-reed shawm
piva: A kind of Lombard bagpipe
putipù: A friction drum
raganelle: A cog rattle
ribeba: An alternate term, rebab, for the scacciapensieri
scacciapensieri: A mouth harp found in the Alpine north and Sicily, care-chaser
: A tambourine
solitu: A Sardinian traditional shepherd's flute
surdulina: A bagpipe from Basilicata
tamburello: A small frame drum, used to accompany the tarantella, also a tambourine
tamburini: A tambourine
tammora: A large frame drum
tamura: A large frame drum
torototela: A bowed, one-string fiddle, most common in northeast Italy
triangulu: A Sardinian triangle
triccheballacche: A Neapolitan percussion instrument, built with mallets attached to a wooden frame, wooden clapper
tromba degli zingari: An alternate term, trumpet of the Gypsies, for the scacciapensieri
trunfa: A Sardinian jaw harp, or mouth harp, trump, similar to the scacciapensieri

tumborro: A Sardinian tambourine
zampogna: A southern Italian bagpipe, most commonly with two drones and two conical chanters
zampogna a paro: A single-reed and two- or three drone zampogna, found in Calabria and Sicily
zampogna zoppa: A mostly double-reed and variably droned zampogna, found in central Italy

Songs, formats and pieces

addio padre: A post-war political song
ajri: A form of Albanian-Calabrian multi-part song
asprese: A form of multi-part song from Lazio
banda comunale: A local, civic band
a bandieri bella: A form of Calabrian secular multi-part song
: Sicilian brass bands
basso: A kind of song in Dignano
bei: A kind of Tuscan polyphony, especially known near Monte Amiata, also bei-bei
: A singing style for three men, most common in Rovigno in Istria
boare: work songs
canti alla boara: A kind of lyric song associated with the cantaustorie
buiasche: A kind of polyphonic song from the village of Bogli
: A song form peculiar to Rovigno
camminareccia: A piece of wedding music in the sonata per la sposa of Alta Sabina
canzone a ballo: A dance song
canzone Italiana: Italian song
canzone Napoletana: A kind of popular song from Naples, Neapolitan song
canzune: A Sicilian term for lyric songs
canti a catoccu: A kind of lyric song
canti carnascialeschi: Carnival songs
cepranese: A form of multi-part song from Lazio
cioparedda: A form of Calabrian multi-part song
concertini: Small, violin-based ensembles most common in Emilia, Bagolino and Resia
canto a coppia''': A kind of central Italian two-part singing similar to canti a vatoccucozzupara: A form of Calabrian multi-part songcanto a dispetto: A Tuscan term, song of the despised, equivalent to canto a vatoccuendecasillabo: A central Italian song form with phrases of eleven syllablescanti alla falciatora: Scything songsfogli volanti: Printed popular songs called in English broadsides, most commonly used for Italian balladsgiustiniane: A kind of popular historic song, named after Leonardo Giustinianilaude: Strophic songs, often in Latincanti lirici: Italian lyric songs, or canto lirico-monostrificicanti alla longa: A kind of lyric songmaggi a serenata: A maggio love songmaggio della anime purganti: A maggio song for the souls in Purgatorymaggio delle ragazze: A maggio song for young girlsmaggio drammatico: A music and drama celebration held during maggio: A kind of dance song, most common in Trento; it is composed of six-line stanzas of eleven syllables per linemantignada: A song form peculiar to Sissanometitora: A form of two-part song from Laziocanti alla mietitora: Harvesting songsmondine: A kind of rural, woman's folk song
: work songsmontasolina: A form of multi-part song from Lazioninna nanna: A folk lullaby
: A form of Calabrian multi-part songorazioni: A kind of Sicilian narrative folk songcanti degli orbi: A kind of Sicilian narrative folk song, associated with blind musiciansorologio della passione: An alternate term, used in musical collections, for the canto della passioneottava rima: An eight line song, most common in Central Italy, especially Lazio, Tuscany and Abruzzopajarella: A form of Lazio multi-part songcanto della passione: A central Italian begging song, performed before Easter, also known as orologio della passione (clock of the passion)alla pennese: A kind of two-part singing from Lazio, similar to canti a vatoccucanto a pennese: A work songcanti a pera: A kind of lyric song from Gallesanopiagnereccia: A piece of wedding music in the sonata per la sposa of Alta Sabinapoeti contadini: An alternate term, peasant poets, for ottava rimapolesane: A kind of dance songcanti de questua: Begging songsrecchia: A kind of central Italian two-part singing similar to canti a vatoccua recchione: A form of multi-part song from Lazioa reuta: A form of Lazian multi-part songrispetti: A kind of lyric songa rosabella: A form of Calabrian multi-part songserenata: A love songsonata per la sposa: A musical ritual from Alta Sabinasonetto: A lyrical form consisting of four lines of seven syllablescanti alla stesa: A kind of lyric songstornelli: A kind of solo lyric song, from the Provençal estorn, to challengestornello: A Sicilian folk songstoria: A kind of southern, long songstrambotti: A kind of lyric song, from the Provençal  estribar, to lashstranotti: A kind of lyric songstrina: A form of Calabrian multi-part songtenores: Sardinian polyphonic chanttestamenti: A kind of Carnival song
I Tubi Lungimiranti: dirty and garagetiir: A kind of polyphonic song from Premana in Lombardytrallalero: A kind of Genoese polyphonycanti a vatoccu: A kind of polyphonic lyric song, usually for two to three women, songs in the manner of a bell clapper, most common in Umbria, and the Apennines of Abruzza and the Marche
: A form of multi-part song from Laziovillanella: A form of Calabrian multi-part songvillotte: A kind of lyric song with verses of 8 or 11 syllablesa voca regolare: A form of Calabrian multi-part songa voca diritta: A form of Calabrian multi-part songvjersh: A form of Albanian multi-part song found in Calabria and Basilicata

Techniquesaccordo: A multi-part singing technique, also canto ad accordobasci: The bass voice in a trallalero ensemblebassu: The bass voice of the Sardinian tenoresboghe: The lead vocalist of a Sardinian tenores ensemblechitarra: A guitar, also a voice in trallalero ensembles that imitates the guitarcontra: The counter-vocalist of the Sardinian tenorescontrobasso: The baritone vocalist of the trallalero traditioncontrubassu: Alternate term for controbasso, the baritone vocalist of the trallalero traditioncuntrètu: A falsetto voicemesa boghe: The middle voice of the Sardinian tenoresprimmu: The tenor voice in a trallalero ensemble

Other termsbandautore: A cantautore who composes music for a bandbello ideale: An aesthetic idea which embraced a predominant melody and other elements, beautiful idealboghe ballu: In Sardinian, harmony, or a danceable singing rhythm, literally we dance with our voicecantastorie: Itinerant musicians, now most commonly found in Sicilycantautori: Popular, modern singer-songwriterscarnevale: The Italian Carnivalcarnevale de Bagolino: A very famous Carnival, in the town of Bagolino, Bresciacondanna della vecchiaccia: An Umbrian ceremony that heralds the return of spring, the condemnation of the cronemaggio: A May celebrationmamutones: Masked performers in processions in Mamoiada in Sardiniascacciamarzo: A spring holidaysega la vecchia: An old mid-Lent ceremony, the sawing of the witchtarantate: Women who had been supposedly poisoned by the tarantula bite, and intended to cure themselves through the tarantella ritualtratto marzo: A spring holidayurlatori: A shouter, an expressive vocalistla vecchia: A carnevale ritual from Pontelangiornoveglie'': A central Italian musical gathering

References

 
Italian music
Wikipedia glossaries using unordered lists